The Austin Museum of Popular Culture (AusPop) is a Texas 501(c)(3) nonprofit organisation dedicated to collecting, preserving, and exhibiting art and memorabilia that reflect Austin's eclectic contributions to popular culture worldwide.

Auspop, formerly known as SouthPop, champions Austin artists who were mainly responsible for "weird" Austin.

History and mission
SouthPop was formally established in 2005 to collect and display concert posters by a group of artist known as the Armadillo Art Squad who came together around the Armadillo World Headquarters.

It was born from a community art collective known as the South Austin Museum of Popular Culture which had coalesced in 2004 around the private files of Henry Gonzalez.
The collections expanded to include other live music venues of the 1970s including Threadgills, the Vulcan Gas Company, the Austin Opry House, and Antone's. 
Eventually the purpose of SouthPop was to preserve the legacy of Austin's counterculture and popular
arts through exhibitions, collection, and scholarship. The center has evolved to become a collecting and exhibiting center for photography, prints, and non-traditional art and has widened the visibility of the Austin cultural scene. 

The South Austin Museum
of Popular Culture is an independent resource available to those who want to learn more 
about the Austin's cultural history and is not supported by any government institution.

Armadillo Art Squad
An extensive 1997 review of the Armadillo Art Squad named many of its artists and cartoonists (often one and the same), including Gilbert Shelton, Jim Franklin, Guy Juke, Kerry Awn, Michael E. Arth, Ken Featherston, Henry Gonzales, Danny Garrett, Sam Yeates, Micael Priest,  Gary McIlhenny, and Jack Jaxon.
This group of local Austin artists designed posters and handbills for Eddie Wilson's Armadillo World Headquarters at a time when the Austin music scene was fueled by the Cosmic Cowboy movement.

Memorial Wall
Southpop's outdoor memorial, 'Wall of Fame', as Austin humorist John Kelso calls it, has photos of over 150 people.  It honors them for their contribution to Austin's creative scene.  The outdoor wall includes both the famous and the obscure, from Bill Hicks, Stevie Ray Vaughan and Janis Joplin to Bill Livingood, Bud Shrake, and Poodie Locke, Willie Nelson's stage manager.

Name changes
Originally named the South Austin Museum of Popular Culture and was referred to as SAMOPC.  In 2010 it was renamed the South Austin Popular Culture Center, and has since become known locally as SouthPop. Subsequently the name has been changed back to South Austin Museum of Popular Culture. 
In September 2019 Leea Mechling, the executive director announced that the name is changing to Austin Museum of Popular Culture (AusPop) and that the museum will relocate to a new space on North Lamar behind Threadgill’s restaurant.

Recognition
The museum is the subject of many articles in the Austin Chronicle, who in 2004 distinguished the museum as the "Best Place to Art Trip."
The New York Times included SAMOPC in a Frugal Traveler video.

See also
 List of music museums

External links

 Museum website
 South Austin Popular Culture Center at Google Cultural Institute
 Facebook page

References

Museums in Austin, Texas
Art museums and galleries in Texas
Art museums established in 2004
2004 establishments in Texas
501(c)(3) organizations